Lazear is an unincorporated town, a census-designated place (CDP), and a post office located in and governed by Delta County, Colorado, United States. The Lazear post office has the ZIP Code 81420 (post office boxes).

History
The Lazear Post Office has been in operation since 1912. The community has the name of J. B. Lazear, the original owner of the town site.

Geography

Demographics

See also

Outline of Colorado
Index of Colorado-related articles
State of Colorado
Colorado cities and towns
Colorado census designated places
Colorado counties
Delta County, Colorado

References

External links

Delta County website

Unincorporated communities in Delta County, Colorado
Unincorporated communities in Colorado